Justin Lall (September 27, 1986 – August 19, 2020) was an American bridge player. He won his first masterpoints in 1997, and became a Life Master in 1999. In 2012, Lall became the youngest Grand Life Master at the age of 25, a record that has since been surpassed by Zach Grossack.

Bridge accomplishments

Wins
 World Junior Teams Championship (2) 2005, 2006
 Buffett Cup (1) 2012 
 North American Bridge Championships (5)
 Grand National Teams (1) 2006 
 Nail Life Master Open Pairs (1) 2011 
 Norman Kay Platinum Pairs (2) 2012, 2017 
 Roth Open Swiss Teams (1) 2015

Runners-up

 Bermuda Bowl (1) 2011 
 North American Bridge Championships (2)
 Keohane North American Swiss Teams (1) 2009 
 Nail Life Master Open Pairs (1) 2009

Personal life
Lall was born to Hemant (also a bridge player) and Jan, along with his sister Jessica.

On February 17, 2009, Lall jumped off the Brooklyn Bridge in a suicide attempt but survived; Lall stated that he was bipolar and off his medicine. He died from liver disease and is survived by his longtime girlfriend Stefanie and her son Aiden.

Notes

External links
 

1986 births
2020 deaths
American contract bridge players